I Am Spoonbender is an American/Canadian multimedia group formed in San Francisco in early 1997 by composer/multi-instrumentalist/producer Dustin Donaldson, with Brian Jackson and cub guitarist Robynn Iwata (a.k.a. 'Cup', who joined halfway through the recording of the debut album Sender/Receiver, after abandoning the guitar for synthesizers).

Their musical style has been favorably compared to Brian Eno, Can, and This Heat, and touches on elements of neo-psychedelia, ambient music, electronic music, tape music, psychedelic folk, synthpop, post-rock, post-punk, progressive, math rock, jazz, noise, pop, and musique concrete, with a distinctly experimental/avant-garde bent. Their sound has evolved over time and remains distinctive, making it difficult to place the group into a concise style or genre. Dustin Donaldson has noted that most of their influences are outside of music itself, although he has mentioned being inspired conceptually by Morton Subotnick, Wire, Laurie Anderson and Devo.

Members

Current members
 Dustin Donaldson: synths, drums, vocals, production 1997-
 "Cup" (Robynn Iwata): synths, vocals 1997-

Current live members
 Kevin Farkas - 2nd drumset, synths
 Nolan Cook - bass and synths (The Residents, Dimesland)
 Drew Cook - bass and synths (Dimesland)
 MA'AT - perception management and subliminatexture

Past members
 Brian Jackson: bass, synths, 1997–2000
 Marc Kate: synths, 1998-2003

Past session members
 Dave Edwardson (Neurosis): bass on Shown Actual Size, Buy Hidden Persuaders

Past live members
 Chad Amory: bass, synths, 2000–2001

Discography

Live appearances
Live appearances are rare. In addition to their own shows, I Am Spoonbender has performed on bills with Mogwai, Glenn Branca, Cibo Matto, The New Pornographers, Wire, Money Mark, Einstürzende Neubauten, Hot Hot Heat, Steven Stapleton, Mike Patton, Secret Chiefs 3, Man or Astro-man?, The Locust, Siouxsie and the Banshees, Kid606, The Faint, Grandaddy, Trans Am, Pleasure Forever, Chrome, Ariel Pink, Notwist, Oneida, Tarentel, Fly Pan Am, Matmos, and Explosions in the Sky, among others.

References

External links
 I Am Spoonbender website (link to history of archives at Internet Archive)
 AllMusicGuide 
 
 Interview in Montreal Mirror, 2003
 Interview in NOW magazine, 2003
Interview on CitySearch

American experimental rock groups
Musical groups from San Francisco
Mint Records artists
Musical groups established in 1997
1997 establishments in California